Antonina W. Bouis is a German literary translator from Russian to English. She has been called "the best literary translator from Russian" by Publishers Weekly.

Life
Born in West Germany, Bouis was educated in the United States. She has degrees from Barnard College and Columbia University.

Translations

 Roadside Picnic. A Novel by Arkady and Boris Strugatsky. New York: Macmillan Publishing Co, 1977.
 Mahomet, Mahmed, Mamish. A Novel by Chinghiz Gusseinov. New York: Macmillan, 1978.
 Nocturne [Travels of the Dilettantes] by Bulat Okudzhava. New York: Harper & Row, 1978.
 Testimony [The Memoirs of Dmitri Shostakovich] by Solomon Volkov. New York: Harper & Row, 1979.
 Professor Dowell's Head, by Alexander Belyaev. New York: Macmillan Publishing Co., 1980.
 Wild Berries by Yevgeny Yevtushenko. New York: William Morrow & Co, 1984.
 (tr. with Albert Todd and Yevgeny Yevtushenko) Almost at the end by Yevgeny Yevtushenko. New York: H. Holt, 1987.
 Danilov, the Violist by Vladimir Orlov. William Morrow and Co, 1987.
 Forever Nineteen. A Novel by Grigory Baklanov. New York: J.B. Lippincott, 1989.
 The Suitcase by Sergei Dovlatov. New York: Grove Weidenfeld, 1990.
 Moscow and beyond, 1986-1989 by Andrei Sakharov. New York: Knopf, 1991.
 Fatal half measures : the culture of democracy in the Soviet Union by Yevgeny Yevtushenko. Boston: Little, Brown and Co., 1991.
 Fear by Anatoli Rybakov. Boston: Little, Brown, 1992.
 Don't Die Before You're Dead by Yevgeny Yevtushenko. New York: Random House, 1995.
 Dust and Ashes by Anatoli Rybakov. Boston: Little, Brown, 1996.
 A letter for Daria by Ekaterina Gordeeva. Boston: Little, Brown, 1998.
 The world of Andrei Sakharov: a Russian physicist's path to freedom by Gennady Gorelik. Oxford, New York: Oxford University Press, 2004.
 Shostakovich and Stalin : the extraordinary relationship between the great composer and the brutal dictator by Solomon Volkov. New York: Knopf, 2004.
 Collapse of an Empire: Lessons for Modern Russia by Yegor Gaidar. Washington, D.C.: Brookings Institution Press, 2007.
 Alexander II : The Last Great Tsar by Edvard Radzinsky. New York: Free Press, 2005.
 Woman with a Movie Camera: My Life as a Russian Filmmaker by Marina Goldovskaya. Austin: University of Texas Press, 2006.
 (tr. with Jamey Gambrell) White walls: collected stories by Tatyana Tolstaya. New York: New York Review Books, 2007.
 The magical chorus: a history of Russian culture from Tolstoy to Solzhenitsyn by Solomon Volkov. New York : Alfred A. Knopf, 2008.
 A Dog's Heart by Mikhail Bulgakov.  Oneworld Classics Ltd., 2011.
 Romanov riches : Russian writers and artists under the tsars by Solomon Volkov. New York: Knopf, 2011.
 Russia: A Long View by Yegor Gaidar. Cambridge: MIT Press, 2012.
 Oblivion by Sergei Lebedev. new vessel press, 2016
 The Year of the Comet by Sergei Lebedev. New Vessel press, 2014

References

Year of birth missing (living people)
Living people
Russian–English translators
Literary translators
20th-century American translators
20th-century American women writers
Barnard College alumni
Columbia University alumni
21st-century American women